Geoff Bloomfield (born 5 February 1956) is an Australian equestrian. He competed in two events at the 2000 Summer Olympics.

References

External links
 

1956 births
Living people
Australian male equestrians
Olympic equestrians of Australia
Equestrians at the 2000 Summer Olympics
People from Echuca